Fitz Benjamin Hall (born 20 December 1980) is an English former professional footballer and current football agent. He played as a defender in his professional career, and as a striker in amateur football.

Club career

Early career
Hall began his career as a West Ham United youth player on the same day as Paul Konchesky, Bobby Zamora and Jlloyd Samuel but was released at the age of 15. He played for Senrab in Wanstead Flats. Hall was also once told that he wasn't good enough to become a professional footballer but found his lucky break through a friend that got him a trial at Barnet. Hall then joined Barnet as part of a Youth Training Scheme, before moving to non-league Chesham United under the management of Bob Dowie. It was there when he signed his first professional contract at 21 years old. It was at Chesham United when Dowie converted him from playing a striker to a central defence, a position he played throughout his professional career. Hall quickly became a first team regular for the club throughout his time there, making twenty–one appearances and scoring two times in all competitions.

Oldham Athletic
Hall's performances at Chesham came to the attention of Dowie's brother Iain, manager of Oldham Athletic, who bought him for £30,000 during the 2001–02 season and signed a two–year contract with the club. He made his debut for the club, starting the whole game, in a 2–1 loss against Wycombe Wanderers on 13 April 2002, This turns out to be his only appearance of the season.

The 2002–03 season saw Hall saw him shine as he was part of a defence as a first team regular. Hall helped the club keep four clean sheets in four matches between 13 August 2002 and 26 August 2002 despite being sent–off in a 0–0 draw against Brentford on 17 August 2002.  His performance led manager Dowie to praise his performance on being "comfortable on the ball and quick in the tackle." After serving a one match suspension, he returned to the starting line–up against Notts County on 7 September 2002, winning 3–1. Hall, once again, helped Oldham Athletic keep three clean sheets in the next four matches between 17 September 2002 and 5 October 2002, in which he missed a match against Swindon Town. Hall then scored his first goal for the club against Stockport County on 2 November 2002. Two weeks later on 16 November 2002, he scored his second goal for Oldham Athletic, in 2–2 draw against Burton Albion in the first round of the FA Cup. His performance saw him being awarded November's Player of the Month in the second division. A month later on 21 December 2002, Hall scored his second goal, in a 1–0 win against Chesterfield. His next goal for Oldham Athletic came on 14 January 2003 against Brentford, in a 2–1 win, Five days later on 19 January 2003, he signed a new deal, which would have kept him at the club until 2005, Six days later on 26 January 2003, however, Hall received a straight red card in the 28th minute for a foul on Steve Jones, in a 3–1 loss. After serving a two–match suspension, Hall returned to the starting line–up against Notts County and helped the club draw 1–1 on 22 February 2003. This was followed by scoring his fifth goal for Oldham Athletic, in a 1–0 win against Mansfield Town. Despite being further sidelined with a toe injury that saw him miss two matches, he continued to remain as a first team regular for the rest of the 2002–03 season, as the club reached the play–offs and proved to be only the second best to league champions Wigan Athletic. Hall played in both legs against Queens Park Rangers, as Oldham Athletic lost 2–1 on aggregate. At the end of the 2003–04 season, he went on to make fifty appearances and scoring five times in all competitions. For his performance, Hall was named in the PFA Team of the Year.

However, there was a financial meltdown at the club, leading his future in doubt and reports suggested that Hall could be a free agent by exercising his rights if he didn't receive his salaries by then. On 3 July 2003, Hall and teammates, Will Haining and Les Pogliacomi informed Oldham Athletic that they threatened to leave the club after they weren't paid the previous month. This led to British clubs expressed their interests in signing Hall, such as, Everton, Cardiff City, Bolton Wanderers. After his departure, manager Dowie accused Oldham Athletic's owner Chris Moore of "ripping the heart out of the club" for his role on selling key players, including Hall.

Southampton
Hall was sold to Premiership side Southampton for a transfer fee between £250,000 and £350,000.

He made his debut for the club, starting the whole game, in a 4–0 loss against Jönköpings Södra in a friendly match on 24 July 2003. Hall was involved in a number of friendly matches throughout the club's pre–season tour. However, he did not manage to break into Southampton's first team on a regular basis, due to competitions and his own injury concern. As a result, Hall had to wait on 16 December 2003 to make his debut for the club, starting the whole game, in a 1–0 loss against Bolton Wanderers in the quarter–finals of the League Cup. He made his Premiership debut, starting the whole game, in a 1–0 loss against Arsenal on 29 December 2003. In his second league Premier League appearance against Birmingham City on 10 January 2004, however, Hall scored an own goal, as Southampton lost 2–1. By April, he received a handful of first team appearances for the rest of the 2003–04 season. By the end of the 2003–04 season, Hall had made 12 first-team appearances in all competitions.

Crystal Palace
Due to his lack of first team opportunities, Hall was linked with a move to newly promoted Premier League club Crystal Palace, where his former manager Iain Dowie was the manager and made a bid for him in late July. He joined Crystal Palace at the beginning of the 2004–05 season for a reported transfer fee of £1.5 million.

Hall made his debut for Crystal Palace, starting a match in a midfield position and played 78 minutes before being substituted, in a 1–1 draw against Norwich City in the opening game of the season. Since then, he went straight into the first team for the club's first season back in the Premiership, playing in the midfield position. At times, Hall rotated into playing in the centre–back position. He then scored his first goal for Crystal Palace, scoring from a header, in a 3–0 win against West Brom Albion on 23 October 2004. However, Hall suffered a knee injury that saw him miss two matches. It wasn't until on 20 November 2004 when he made his return to the starting line–up in a centre–back position, as Crystal Palace lost 2–0 against Newcastle United. Since returning from injury, Hall continued to regain his first team place, forming a centre–back partnership with Gonzalo Sorondo. He then scored his second goal for the club, "strucking an unstoppable 20-yard shot", in a 2–2 draw against his former club, Southampton, in hopes of Crystal Palace avoid relegation. In the last game of the season against local rivals, Charlton Athletic, Hall played the whole game, in a 2–2 draw and made an impressive display, but the result wasn't enough, as the win was needed, resulting in the club's relegation. Despite being sidelined with injuries during the 2004–05 season, he went on to make thirty–seven appearance, scoring twice in all competitions. Local newspaper, Your Local Guardian reviewed the 2004–05 season and called Hall the best signing for Crystal Palace this season.

At the start of the 2005–06 season, Hall was appointed team captain of Crystal Palace, replacing Michael Hughes following the club's relegation back to the Championship. He helped the club keep three consecutive clean sheets between 20 August 2005 and 10 September 2005. Despite serving a suspension for picking up five yellow cards in the season, Hall continued to start eleven matches in the centre–back position, forming a partnership with Darren Ward. This lasted until he missed one match, due to suffering from a knock during a 1–1 draw against rivals, Millwall on 3 December 2005 and was substituted in the 59th minute. Halfway through the season, many Crystal Palace fans felt that Hall's performance was being hindered by the burden of captaincy, and after several poor performances, and several yellow cards, Hughes was re-appointed team captain in January 2006. Despite losing the captaincy, Hall remained in the first team until the end of the season, where at one point, he played in a full–back position. During a 1–0 win against Cardiff City on 4 February 2006, Hall received a straight red card following an off-the-ball incident involving Joe Ledley and served a three match suspension. After serving a three match suspension, he returned to the starting line–up, in a 1–1 draw against rivals, Millwall on 18 February 2006. This was followed up by scoring his second goal of the season, in a 4–1 win against Norwich City. After missing two matches due to another injury, his return saw him contribute to the club's place in the Championship play–offs. Hall played in both legs of the Championship play–offs against Watford, as Crystal Palace lost 3–0. At the end of the 2005–06 season, he had made 44 appearances and scoring once in all competitions.

Wigan Athletic

Hall moved from Crystal Palace to Premiership side Wigan Athletic for an undisclosed fee on 26 June 2006. New Palace boss Peter Taylor cited a £3 million get-out clause in Hall's contract as the reason for the transfer. He later cited Dowie's departure was factor for him to move on.

Hall made his debut for the club, starting the whole game, in a 2–1 loss against Newcastle United in the opening game of the season. He then started in the next five matches, playing in the centre–back position, forming a partnership with Arjan de Zeeuw. This lasted until Hall suffered a virus that saw him miss one match. After missing one game out, he returned to the starting line–up against Manchester United on 14 October 2006. However during a match against Manchester City on 21 October 2006, his return was short–lived Hall suffered an ankle ligament damage, following a challenge from Dietmar Hamann and was substituted at half time, as Wigan Athletic won 4–0. Initially out for three weeks, Hall was eventually sidelined for five weeks. It wasn't until on 26 November 2006 when he returned to the first team from injury, coming on as a 67th-minute substitute, in a 3–1 loss against Tottenham Hotspur. Following this, Hall regained his first team place, playing in the centre–back position with de Zeeuw for the next eleven matches. In a match against Arsenal on 11 February 2007, with the club leading 1–0, he scored an own goal in the 81st minute to make the score 1–1; which unfortunately, four minutes later, Tomáš Rosický scored a winner. In a follow–up match against Watford on 21 February 2007, things took for the worst for Hall when he received a straight red card after a challenge on Johan Cavalli in a 1–1 draw. After the match, Wigan Athletic unsuccessfully appealed against Hall's sending off and he served a three-match ban. After serving a three match suspension, Hall returned to the starting line–up against Charlton Athletic on 31 March 2007 and was at fault when he conceded a penalty against following a foul on Marcus Bent, allowing Darren Bent to convert it and score, resulting in the opposition team scoring the only goal of the match. Hall started in the next two matches before suffering a knee injury during a match against Aston Villa on 9 April 2007 and was substituted in the 52nd minute, as the club drew 1–1. After undergoing surgery, it was announced that the player would be out for the rest of the 2006–07 season. At the end of the 2006–07 season, he went on to make twenty–six appearances in all competitions. Reflecting on his season, local newspaper Manchester Evening News said: "Very poor and never looked like living up to his price tag. He never really got to grips with the job and missed far too many games."

The 2007–08 season saw Hall's first team opportunities limited after falling out with Chris Hutchings and then manager Steve Bruce. As a result, he made two appearances for the club. Clubs in the Championship were reported as tracking him, and Hall finally signed for Queens Park Rangers.

Queens Park Rangers
Hall was one of a number of players brought in by Championship side Queens Park Rangers during the early part of the January 2008 transfer window, signing a four and a half-year contract, after the club paid an undisclosed fee.

He made his debut for Queens Park Rangers, starting the whole game, in a 1–0 loss against Chelsea in the third round of the FA Cup. However during a 3–1 loss against Cardiff City on 30 January 2008, Hall suffered a groin injury and was substituted in the 38th minute. After being sidelined for weeks, he made his return to the starting line–up against Sheffield United on 23 February 2008 and played the whole game, as the club drew 1–1. Hall followed up in the next three matches by helping Queens Park Rangers keep three clean sheets in three matches between 26 February 2008 and 5 March 2008. After missing one match, due to another groin injury that he sustained, Hall returned to the starting line–up against Blackpool on 11 March 2008 and played the whole game to help the club win 3–2. He started in the next six matches until suffering an injury and was substituted in the 34th minute during a 1–0 win against Charlton Athletic on 19 April 2008. At the end of the 2007–08 season, Hall went on to make fifteen appearances in all competitions.

Hall scored his first Queens Park Rangers goal in the first game of the 2008–09 season against Barnsley, and went on to score his second just two minutes later, before having a penalty saved to deny him a hat-trick, winning 2–1. However, he suffered a groin injury that saw him out for a month. Hall didn't make his return to the first team until a match against Derby County on 27 September 2008, starting the whole game, in a 2–0 loss. He then helped the club keep three clean sheets in three matches between 21 October 2008 and 28 October 2008. Since returning from injury, Hall continued to be involved in the first team despite facing centre–back competitions from Kaspars Gorkšs and Damion Stewart and at a result, he was placed on the substitute bench at times. In a match against Watford on 22 November 2008, Hall received a straight red card in the 81st minute for a foul on Will Hoskins, in a 3–0 loss. After serving a three match suspension, he returned to the starting line–up against Sheffield Wednesday on 9 December 2008, coming on as a late substitute, in a 1–0 loss. At the end of the 2008–09 season, Hall went on to make twenty–seven appearances and scoring two times in all competitions.

At the start of the 2009–10 season, Hall started in the first five league matches of the season, forming a centre–back partnership with Peter Ramage and Damion Stewart. However, he suffered an injury that saw him out for a month. Hall didn't make his return to the first team until on 30 October 2009 against Leicester City when he came on as a 54th-minute substitute, in a 2–1 loss. Following his return from the first team, Hall found himself in and out of the starting line–up for the rest of the first half of the season and once faced with a back injury along the way. By the time he departed from the club, he went on to make fourteen appearances in all competitions.

After his loan spell at Newcastle United came to an end, Hall stayed at Queens Park Rangers for the 2010–11 season following talks over his future at the club. Shortly after, he was appointed as Queens Park Rangers’ new captain. Hall made his first appearance for Queens Park Rangers since returning from a loan spell at Newcastle United came in the opening game of the season against Barnsley and scored his first goal of the season, in a 4–0 win. However, he suffered a hamstring injury during a 3–0 win against Sheffield United on 14 August 2010 and was substituted in the 50th minute. After the match, it was announced that Hall would be sidelined for a month, but returned in mid–October, only to be sidelined with another injury by the end of the month. Hall didn't make his first team return on 20 November 2010 against Preston North End, starting a match and played 81 minutes before being substituted, in a 3–1 win. Following his return from injury, he continued to find himself in and out of the first team. Hall also faced with injury problems for the rest of the 2010–11 season. In a match against Watford on 30 April 2011, he started and played 23 minutes before being substituted due to injury, as the club won 2–0 to seal a promotion to the Premier League. At the end of the 2010–11 season, Hall went on to make twenty appearances and scoring once in all competitions.

Ahead of the 2011–12 season, Hall was told by the club's management that he's no longer wanted in the first team. Despite this, Hall stayed at Queens Park Rangers and became a first team regular, rotating in a centre–back partnership with Danny Gabbidon, Anton Ferdinand and Bruno Perone. In a match against rivals, Fulham on 5 October 2011, he suffered a hamstring injury and started the whole game, as the club lost 6–0. After the match, Hall apologised for both the club's and his own performance through his Twitter account. However, he suffered a hamstring injury and was substituted in the 9th minute, as Queens Park Rangers lost 3–1 against Tottenham Hotspur on 30 October 2011. After being sidelined for a month, Hall made his return to the first team, coming on as an 80th-minute substitute, in a 3–2 loss against Sunderland on 21 December 2011. His return was short–lived when he suffered a groin injury that saw him out for a week. Hall returned to the starting line–up against Milton Keynes Dons in a third round of the FA Cup and played the whole game, in a 1–1 draw on 7 January 2012. However, after Warnock was replaced as manager by Mark Hughes, the arrival of Nedum Onuoha saw the player fall down the Rangers pecking order for the rest of the 2011–12 season. At the end of the 2011–12 season, he was one of eight players to be released.

Newcastle United (loan)
On 29 January 2010, Hall was signed on loan by Newcastle United for the rest of the season. The club tried to sign him earlier in the 2009–10 season, but the move never happened.

He made his debut for Newcastle United in the 5–1 win over Cardiff City at St James' Park and put in a solid performance, before being replaced by Tamás Kádár in the closing stages of the game. Since making debut for the club, he found himself in and out of the first team, due to competitions in the defence. During Newcastle United's 2–2 draw with Bristol City at Ashton Gate Stadium on 20 March 2010, Hall injured his hamstring in a chase with Nicky Maynard and was substituted as a result. After the game, the club's manager Chris Hughton said the player's injury did not look too good. Despite this assessment, Hall recovered in time to play in the match that confirmed Newcastle United as Football League Championship champions on 19 April 2010. His contributions led manager Hughton praising him, saying: "I am delighted with Fitz. When you go somewhere on loan the one thing you want and need to do is to play. He has been able to do that with us, but it has also been very frustrating for him to miss out. I felt for him when he was injured, but he has done very well for us when he has played." His return was short–lived when Hall didn't play for the rest of the 2009–10 season. At the end of the 2009–10 season, he went on to make seven appearances in all competitions.

Following Newcastle's promotion to the Premier League, Hall was keen to make a permanent deal but it didn't happen, and he returned to his parent club.

Watford
Hall signed a one-year contract with Watford in July 2012, along with seven new signings. Upon joining the club, he was given a number six shirt.

However, Hall suffered a setback when he was not featured in any of Watford's games in pre-season due to a lack of fitness and was sidelined for a month. Hall finally made his debut for the club, coming on as a 69th-minute substitute, in a 2–2 draw against Bristol City on 22 September 2012. This was followed up by scoring his first goal for Watford, goal in a 3–2 win over Huddersfield Town. He then started in the next six matches for the club, forming a centre–back partnership with Neuton and Tommie Hoban. This lasted until Hall suffered a hamstring injury that kept him out for weeks. He made his return from injury, starting the whole game, in a 2–2 draw against Blackpool on 24 November 2012. Following this, Hall started in the next six matches for the club until he suffered a hamstring injury and was substituted in the 42nd minute, during a 3–1 win against Brighton & Hove Albion on 29 December 2012. After being sidelined for weeks, Hall made his return from injury against Nottingham Forest on 26 January 2013, coming on as a 70th-minute substitute, in a 1–0 win. He then started in the next three matches for Watford until suffering another hamstring injury that kept him out for a month. It wasn't until on 29 March 2013 when Hall made his return to the starting line–up, in a 3–3 draw against Burnley. However in a follow–up match against Hull City, his return was short–lived when Hall suffered a hamstring injury and missed the rest of the season, as the club finished third place in the league. Throughout the Championship play–offs, he played once, coming against Leicester City in the semi–finals first leg, as Watford lost the play–off final against Crystal Palace. At the end of the 2012–13 season, Hall went on to make twenty–two appearances and scoring once in all competitions. Following this, his future at the club was uncertain after yet being offered a new contract by Watford. By July, he was a free agent when his contract expired on 1 July 2013.

On 22 November 2013, Hall re-joined Watford on a one-month deal having trained with the club previously for a number of months. He made one start and one substitute appearance before his contract expired but was allowed to continue training with Watford under new head coach Giuseppe Sannino.

On 6 January 2014, Hall joined Watford for a third time after agreeing a new short-term deal. He made four more appearances for the club since leaving Watford earlier this month. This was later extended until the end of the season. However, Hall suffered Achilles injury and was sidelined for a month. Despite his recovery and maintaining his fitness in early–April, he remained on the sidelines for the rest of the 2013–14 season. At the end of the 2013–14 season, Hall went on to make six appearances in all competitions.

Along with Lucas Neill and Albert Riera, who were also on short-term contracts, it was confirmed on 4 June that Hall would be departing Vicarage Road at the end of his contract.

Amateur football
After leaving Watford, Hall signed for Sunday League side Percival, based in Waltham Abbey. Playing as a striker, Hall scored a hat-trick on his debut as Percival defeated Enfield Rangers 8–0 in their Premier Division fixture and scored nine times in 14 league matches during the season.

Outside football
After retiring from professional football, Hall became a football consultant for Base Soccer Agency.

International career
In April 2004, during his Southampton career, Hall received an unexpected call-up to be eligible to play for Scotland national team through his grandmother. However, Hall denied having talk over a possible call-up to the Scotland national team, stating he had heard nothing from manager Berti Vogts. Hall later said: "Every kid growing up wants to play for their country, but I'm not going to set myself any targets because I don't want to be left disappointed if that doesn't happen. But at the moment I am concentrating on getting myself established in a Premiership team. I have spoken to him Vogts when I was at Southampton, but I was born in England and I see myself as English. That's not snubbing Scotland, but I just want to concentrate on playing in the Premiership."

Hall is also eligible to play for Barbados and was called for the Caribbean national team in 2011. In 2015, he stated that he would like to play for Barbados and would return to professional football if called up.

Personal life
In October 2004, Hall became a first time father. Throughout his career, Hall earned a nickname: "One Size". As a result, he launched a clothing line that was named after his nickname.

Hall briefly appeared in the opening of the movie The Fifth Element, playing the role of Aziz; the boy who runs to turn on the lights for John Bennett's Priest. Growing up, he supported Arsenal.

Career statistics

Honours
Newcastle United
Championship: 2009–10

Queens Park Rangers
Championship: 2010–11

Individual
PFA Team of the Year: 2002–03 Second Division

References

External links

Fitz Hall Career Profile

1980 births
Living people
People from Leytonstone
Association football defenders
Association football utility players
English footballers
Senrab F.C. players
West Ham United F.C. players
Barnet F.C. players
Chesham United F.C. players
Oldham Athletic A.F.C. players
Southampton F.C. players
Crystal Palace F.C. players
Wigan Athletic F.C. players
Queens Park Rangers F.C. players
Newcastle United F.C. players
Watford F.C. players
English Football League players
Premier League players
English sportspeople of Barbadian descent
Black British sportspeople
Association football agents